Pudumadam is a village in Ramanathapuram district in the Indian state of Tamil Nadu. It is located near the old National Highway 49, that connects Kochi and Dhanushkodi. The nearest train station is 4 km away, at Uchippuli. The closest major cities are Ramanathapuram and Rameswaram, which are about 25 km and 37 km away from Pudumadam, respectively. Pudumadam is located on the peninsula which leads to Pamban Island.

Economy

As a coastal town, Pudumadam's economy was traditionally based on fishing and trade, especially with Sri Lanka, which is across the Gulf of Mannar from Tamil Nadu.

Education
Pudumadam Higher Secondary School (previously Pudumadam High School) is located in Pudumadam, and serves the general area.

Religion

95% of Pudumadam's population is Muslim, with 3% Christian and 2% Hindu. There are four mosques in Pudumadam, at South Street, North Street, Middle Street, and Tamil Nadu Thawheed, which are mostly community funded. Pudumadam also hosts several Hindu temples and one Christian church.

Culture

The Muslim faith plays a significant role in the village's culture. The majority of the village's population speak Tamil.

Centre for Marine and Coastal Studies
Pudumadam is home to Madurai Kamaraj University‘s Centre for Marine and Coastal Studies. The facility is partially funded by the Indian government's Ministry of Earth Sciences, and assists in the development of seawater quality criteria for the Gulf of Mannar. The Institute for Integrated Coastal Area and Marine Management, an agency of the Ministry of Earth Sciences, has sought a report from the Centre regarding their findings.

Utilities

The main water supply of the village is taken from a rainwater canal called Tharavai. Community movements have organized to protect this resource, by building a small dam and planting trees.

References

Villages in Ramanathapuram district